The Armenian Genocide Memorial complex (Hayots tseghaspanutyan zoheri hushahamalir, or Ծիծեռնակաբերդ,  Tsitsernakaberd) is Armenia's official memorial dedicated to the victims of the Armenian genocide, built in 1967 on the hill of Tsitsernakaberd in Yerevan. Every year on 24 April, the Armenian Genocide Remembrance Day, thousands of Armenians gather at the memorial to commemorate the victims of the genocide. The people who gather in Tsiternakaberd lay fresh flowers out of respect for all the people who died in the Armenian genocide. Over the years, from around the world, a wide range of politicians, artists, musician, athletes, and religious figures have visited the memorial.

The Armenian Genocide Museum-Institute (Հայոց ցեղասպանության թանգարան-ինստիտուտ Hayots tseghaspanut'yan tangaran-institut) was opened in 1995.

History 
The memorial sits on one of three hills along the Hrazdan River that carry the name Tsitsernakaberd (literally "swallow's fortress"), and was the site of what was once an Iron Age fortress. Most of the above ground traces at this peak have since disappeared, but upon the smaller hill are still traces of a castle. Archaeological surveys took place in 2007, and excavations uncovered a wall that is hundreds of meters long and may still be seen in many places above ground. An altar cut from stone sits in the middle of a square at the edge of one of the hills, and large stones that weigh approximately two tons are still visible that cover graves from the second millennium BC. Apartments were later built along the hills during Roman times, and were built over with other structures during medieval years. Nearby are also the remains of a large cave.

Construction 
The idea of a genocide monument has its origin in the early 1960s when Hakob Zarobian was designated first secretary of the Communist Party of Armenia in 1962. On 16 July 1964, historians Tsatur Aghayan (the director of the Armenian branch of the Institute of Marxism–Leninism), Hovhannes Injikian (head of the section of Oriental Studies of the Academy of Sciences), and John Kirakosyan (deputy head of the section of ideology of the Central Committee of the party) sent a highly confidential letter to the Presidium of the Communist Party of Armenia, where they made a series of proposal to commemorate the 50th anniversary of the genocide. Point 8 said: "To build the memorial of the victims of the Armenian people in World War I on account of the income of the population. The memorial must symbolize the rebirth of the Armenian people." On 13 December 1964, Zarobian sent a report-letter to the Central Committee of the Communist Party of the Soviet Union, where the grounds and the meaning of the anniversary and the construction of the "monument dedicated to the Armenian martyrs sacrificed in World War I" were noted. The Council of Ministers of Soviet Armenia on March 16, 1965 adopted a resolution about "Building a Monument to Perpetuate the Memory of the Victims of the Yeghern of 1915."

The construction of the monument began in 1966, during Soviet times, in response to the 1965 Yerevan demonstrations during which one hundred thousand people demonstrated in Yerevan for 24 hours to commemorate the 50th anniversary of the genocide. They demanded the Soviet authorities officially recognise it as a genocide. The memorial is designed by architects Arthur Tarkhanyan, Sashur Kalashyan and artist Hovhannes Khachatryan and was completed in November 1967.

Design 

The 44-meter stele symbolizes the national rebirth of Armenians. Twelve slabs are positioned in a circle, representing the twelve lost provinces in present-day Turkey. In the center of the circle, at a depth of 1.5 meters, there is an eternal flame dedicated to the 1.5 million people killed during the Armenian genocide.

Along the park at the memorial there is a 100-meter wall with the names of towns and villages where massacres and deportations are known to have taken place. On the rear side of the commemoration wall, plates have been attached to honor the people who committed themselves to relieving the distress of the survivors during and after the genocide, among them Johannes Lepsius, Franz Werfel, Armin T. Wegner, Henry Morgenthau Sr., Fridtjof Nansen, Pope Benedict XV, Jakob Künzler and Bodil Biørn.

An alley of trees has been planted to commemorate the genocide victims.

Armenian Genocide Museum-Institute 

The Armenian Genocide Museum-Institute opened in 1995 on the occasion of the 80th anniversary of the genocide. The structure of the museum, planned by architects Sashur Kalashian, Lyudmila Mkrtchyan and sculptor F. Araqelyan, has followed a unique design. Since opening, the museum has received tens of thousands of visitors including schoolchildren, college students and huge numbers of tourists from outside Armenia. The Republic of Armenia has turned visiting the museum into part of state protocol and many official foreign delegations have already visited the museum. These delegations have included Pope John Paul II, Pope Francis, President of the Russian Federation Vladimir Putin, Presidents of France Jacques Chirac and Francois Hollande, and other well-known public and political figures. The museum contains historical documents and is open to the public for guided tours in Armenian, Russian, English, French, and German.

The two-story building is built directly into the side of a hill so as not to detract from the presence of the Genocide Monument nearby. The roof of the museum is flat and covered with concrete tiles. It overlooks the scenic Ararat Valley and majestic Mount Ararat.
The first floor of the museum is subterranean and houses the administrative, engineering and technical maintenance offices as well as Komitas Hall, which seats 170 people. Here also are situated the storage rooms for museum artifacts and scientific objects, as well as a library and a reading hall. The museum exhibit is located on the second floor in a space just over 1,000 square meters in size. There are three main indoor exhibit halls and an outer gallery with its own hall.
The Genocide Monument is designed to memorialize the victims. The Genocide Museum's mission is rooted in the understanding that the Armenian Genocide is important in preventing similar future tragedies, and in keeping with the notion that those who forget the past are condemned to repeat it.

The institute also conducts academic research into the genocide and publishes books on the subject and a journal, International Journal of Armenian Genocide Studies.

Gallery

See also 

 1965 Yerevan demonstrations
 List of visitors to Tsitsernakaberd
 Armenian Genocide Remembrance Day
 List of Armenian genocide memorials

References 

 Genocide.am – Photos of Tsitsernakaberd memorial

External links 

 About Armenian Genocide Museum
 Official site
 Tsitsernakaberd - Virtual Tour
 Armenian Genocide 
 Official Website of Armenian Genocide Centennial 

1967 establishments in the Soviet Union
Armenian genocide commemoration
Armenian genocide memorials
Buildings and structures completed in 1967
Buildings and structures in Yerevan
Genocide museums
History museums in Armenia
Monuments and memorials in Armenia
Monuments and memorials built in the Soviet Union
Museums in Yerevan